Hans Olof Strååt (17 October 1917 – 26 January 1991) was a Swedish film actor. He appeared in 60 films between 1941 and 1987.

Partial filmography

 Bright Prospects (1941) - Student
 Scanian Guerilla (1941) - Guerilla soldier (uncredited)
 General von Döbeln (1942) - Löjtnant Wilhelm von Döbeln
 Ride Tonight! (1942) - Peasant (uncredited)
 The Sin of Anna Lans (1943) - Helge Kjellgren
 Kungsgatan (1943) - Barrskiöld (uncredited)
 En dag skall gry (1944) - Löjtnant Löwenskjöld
 Kungajakt (1944) - Gentleman
 Appassionata (1944) - Gösta
 Kärlekens kors (1946) - Konsul Sandvik
 Restless Blood (1946) - Valter (in Swedish-language version)
 The Night Watchman's Wife (1947) - Doctor (uncredited)
 Kvarterets olycksfågel (1947) - Berg (uncredited)
 Port of Call (1948) - Mr. Vilander
 Loffe the Tramp (1948) - Public prosecutor 
 Stora Hoparegränd och himmelriket (1949) - Salvation Army soldier
 Jack of Hearts (1950) - Wilhelm Canitz
 Barabbas (1953) - Simon from Cyrene (uncredited)
 Our Father and the Gypsy (1954) - Efraim
 Seger i mörker (1954) - Albin Dalén
 Sir Arne's Treasure (1954) - Captain
 Mord, lilla vän (1955) - Martin Eriksson
 The Unicorn (1955) - Harriet's Father
 Smiles of a Summer Night (1955) - Adolf Almgren, photographer (uncredited)
 Flicka i kasern (1955) - Captain
 A Doll's House (1956) - Second mate (uncredited)
 Rätten att älska (1956) - Söderberg
 Det är aldrig för sent (1956) - Art Dealer
 Girls Without Rooms (1956) - Manager
 Sista natten (1956) - The Man
 Tarps Elin (1956) - Vicar
 Vägen genom Skå (1957) - Artist
 The Halo Is Slipping (1957) - Yngve Englund
 Värmlänningarna (1957) - Rik-Ola
 Fridolf Stands Up! (1958) - Fridh
 The Jazz Boy (1958) - Teaterregissören
 Miss April (1958) - Baecke
 No Time to Kill (1959) - Inspector Bergman
 Pirates on the Malonen (1959) - Konrad Schalén
 Loving Couples (1964) - Thomas Meller
 Vindingevals (1968) - Gertson
 The Bookseller Gave Up Bathing (1969) - Vicar
 The Shot (1969) - Ronny's Father
 Fanny and Alexander (1982) - Clergyman at Wedding - Ekdahlska huset
 Raskenstam (1983) - Leonard Johansson
 Två solkiga blondiner (1984) - Axel
 Love Me! (1986) - Larsson
 Mio in the Land of Faraway (1987) - The Spirit / Kato's Spy (Swedish version, voice)
 Nionde kompaniet (1987) - Arvid Jönsson

References

External links

1917 births
1991 deaths
Swedish male film actors
Male actors from Stockholm
Eugene O'Neill Award winners
20th-century Swedish male actors